Celant is a surname. Notable people with the surname include: 

Attilio Celant (born 1942), Italian economist
Germano Celant (1940–2020), Italian art historian, critic and curator